Askren is an English surname. Notable people with the surname include:

Ben Askren (born 1984), American sport wrestler and mixed martial artist
Dave Askren, American jazz guitarist and educator

References